IAS 12: Income Taxes is part of the International Accounting Standards (IAS) and International Financial Reporting Standards (IFRS). IAS 12 sets the accounting treatment of all taxable profits and losses, both national and foreign.

History 
Timeline of IAS 12:

Content 
The taxable amount a company is liable for is composed of its tax base multiplied with the relevant tax rate in its country of settlement. The tax base for a company will in general be the final amount reported in the statement of profit or loss plus or minus any comprehensive income or loss. There are however situations where the accounting profit may differ from the taxable profit. This difference that arises most likely needs to be settled in a future period. Therefore the difference needs to be recognised on the balance sheet as a tax asset or liability. A tax asset is only recognisable to the extent that is likely to be recovered in the future, where a tax liability always needs to be recognised in full.

References 

International Financial Reporting Standards
Tax accounting